Alvi Fokou Fopa  (born May 19, 1990) is a professional Cameroonian-American soccer player who plays for Bangladesh Football Premier League club Saif Sporting Club. He has been described as a "central midfielder ". He can also easily play on the sides, and even right-back when necessary."

Career
Fopa trained in high school, then with the Apejes FC in Yaoundé under President Aimé Léon Zang.  In 2007, at 17, while attending a youth tournament in the US, he was spotted by New York's Metropolitan Oval Academy, which he joined. In 2009, he entered the New York Red Bulls Academy but an injury drew him away from stadiums for a year. After recovery, he joined the team's division 2 team.

In 2012, he signed with the CFC Azul (now AC Connecticut). He helped the team defeat the Vermont Voltage, 4–2, that July closing their inaugural  USL Premier Development League (PDL) season in fourth place in the Northeast Division.  
 
President of Panthère du Ndé Célestine Ketcha Courtès, on a trip to the US seeking to deal with national championship, the Cameroon Cup, the League Cup and the Cup of the Confederation of African Football, asked Fokou to return to Cameroon for play for his team. In February 2013, Fopa helped the team face Unisport FC du Haut-Nkam, the 2012 winners of the Cameroon Cup.

For the 2013–2014 season, he signed with California-based Corinthians, for which he played forward. The next year he signed with Cameroon's Bamboutos FC, a first division club, as midfield offense, one football blogger writing of his "outstanding technical qualities."

References

External links
 Fopa playing for CFC Azul on YouTube

1990 births
American soccer players
Living people
Cameroonian footballers
Cameroon international footballers
Cameroonian expatriate footballers
Expatriate soccer players in the United States
Cameroonian expatriate sportspeople in the United States
Cameroon youth international footballers
Cameroon under-20 international footballers
APEJES Academy players
Panthère du Ndé players
Association football midfielders